Flight to Canada is a 1976 novel by African-American author Ishmael Reed. Set in the last years of the American Civil War and its aftermath, the story makes ready use of anachronism, referencing both actual and fabricated pop-cultural phenomena from the twentieth century, such as the made-up "Beecher Hour" TV show, as well as technology like cassette taps, jumbo jets, and Coffee-Mate. Published the year of the United States Bicentennial, the book was called "a demonized Uncle Tom's Cabin" by the New York Times. Reed himself has described the novel as a “neo–slave narrative," and its influence has been identified in the work of Colson Whitehead.

References

1976 American novels
African-American novels
American satirical novels
Novels about American slavery
Novels by Ishmael Reed
Metafictional novels
Postmodern novels
Random House books